Erik McCoy (born August 27, 1997) is an American football center for the New Orleans Saints of the National Football League (NFL). He played college football at Texas A&M.

Early years
McCoy attended Lufkin High School in Lufkin, Texas. He committed to Texas A&M University to play college football.

College career
After redshirting his first year at Texas A&M in 2015, McCoy became a starter his redshirt freshman year in 2016 and started all 38 games during his career. After his junior year in 2018, he entered the 2019 NFL Draft.

Professional career

McCoy was drafted by the New Orleans Saints in the second round (48th overall) of the 2019 NFL Draft. The Saints traded up with the Miami Dolphins to draft McCoy.

In the 2021 season opener against the Green Bay Packers, McCoy left the game after suffering a calf injury in the first quarter.  He missed the next four games until he returned in the Week 7 win over the Seattle Seahawks.

On September 8, 2022, McCoy signed a five-year, $63.75 million contract extension with the Saints.

McCoy was placed on injured reserve on November 12, 2022. He was designated to return from injured reserve on December 14, 2022, and activated for Week 15.

References

External links
Texas A&M Aggies bio

1997 births
Living people
People from Lufkin, Texas
Players of American football from Texas
American football centers
Texas A&M Aggies football players
New Orleans Saints players